Group D of the 1992 Federation Cup Americas Zone was one of four pools in the Americas zone of the 1992 Federation Cup. Four teams competed in a round robin competition, with the top two teams advancing to the knockout stage..

Chile vs. Costa Rica

Venezuela vs. Jamaica

Chile vs. Venezuela

Costa Rica vs. Jamaica

Chile vs. Jamaica

Venezuela vs. Costa Rica

See also
Fed Cup structure

References

External links
 Fed Cup website

1992 Federation Cup Americas Zone